The 1948–49 British Ice Hockey season featured the English National League and Scottish National League.

English National League

English Autumn Cup

Results

English International Tournament

Results

Scottish National League

Regular season

Playoffs
Semifinals
Falkirk Lions - Paisley Pirates 15:9 on aggregate (12:4, 3:5)
Fife Flyers - Dunfermline Vikings 13:20 on aggregate (5:7, 5:3 - tied, two more games played - 3:4, 0:6)
Final
Falkirk Lions - Dunfermline Vikings 9:4 on aggregate (3:2, 6:2)

Scottish Cup

Results

Simpson Trophy

Results
Final
Perth Panthers - Dundee Tigers 17:14 on aggregate (8:8, 9:6)

Canada Cup

Results

References 

British
1948 in English sport
1949 in English sport
1948–49 in British ice hockey
1948 in Scottish sport
1949 in Scottish sport